The 25th Street Collective, also known as 25C, is a business incubator in Oakland, California. It was founded in 2010 by Hiroko Kurihara. The collective is part of the larger community engaged in the Oakland Art Murmur project.

Collective Members
Two Mile Wines
OaklandSewn
Moxie Shoes
Hiroko Kurihara Designs
Platinum Dirt
COLE Coffee
Ecologique Fashion
Scorpion Sisters jewelry
O’Lover Hats

See also
Oakland Art Murmur
Ghost Ship warehouse fire

References

Business incubators of the United States
Companies based in Oakland, California